EVO Banco, S.A.U. is a Spanish bank based in Madrid.

EVO Banco was created by NCG Banco on March 12, 2012 as a division that would operate its assets outside the autonomous communities of Galicia, Asturias and the Province of León. As part of their launch campaign it introduced its main financial product: Cuenta Inteligente. In the four initial weeks EVO Banco had managed to attract 8,290 clients and 70 million euros.

First acquisition
On September 9, 2013, NCG Banco announced that it would sell the EVO Banco division to the American private equity firm Apollo Global Management for 60 million euros.

On October 16, 2013 EVO Banco, S.A. was established as a subsidiary of NCG Banco, S.A.

Second acquisition 
In May 2019, Spanish bank Bankinter acquired Evo Banco, incorporating its 452,000 clients. In September 2019, it announced that, as of October 18, only the Madrid office would remain operational.

In March 2021, it announced that, effective around May 1, it would relocate its only physical office and corporate headquarters to another location nearby.

References

External links

Official
 Official website
 

Banks based in Madrid
Banks established in 2013